Chakradharpur  Assembly constituency   is an assembly constituency in  the Indian state of Jharkhand.

Members of Assembly 
2005: Sukhram Oraon, Jharkhand Mukti Morcha
2009: Laxman Gilua, Bharatiya Janata Party
2014: Shashibhushan Samad, Jharkhand Mukti Morcha
2019: Sukhram Oraon, Jharkhand Mukti Morcha

Election Results

2019

See also
List of constituencies of the Jharkhand Legislative Assembly

References

Assembly constituencies of Jharkhand